Jianli is a county-level city of southern Hubei Province, China, located on the northern (left) bank of the Yangtze River and bordering Hunan Province to the south. It is under the administration of Jingzhou City.

The character jian (/) is usually read as jiān, but is read as the less-commonly encountered pronunciation jiàn when used in the name Jianli.

Jianli has one Yangtze River crossing, the Jingyue Yangtze River Bridge, located in Bailuo.

Jianli center city name is Rongcheng, the native people prefer to call Chengguan.

Jianli is rich in fresh water products, most of which are crayfish, and rice products.

History
On June 12 2020, Jianli was approved to become a county-level city, under the direct administration of Hubei province and the delegating administration of Jingzhou City.

During the night of 1 June 2015, the Dongfang zhi Xing capsized on the Yangtze River in Jianli County during severe weather.

In the Three Kingdoms period, Sun Quan, Emperor of Eastern Wu, asked supervision of() profit from fish and salt and then came the current name: Jianli.

Administrative divisions

Eighteen towns:
Rongcheng, Zhuhe, Xingou, Gongchang, Zhoulaozui, Huangxiekou, Wangqiao, Chengji, Fenyan, Maoshi, Futiansi, Shangchewan, Bianhe, Chiba, Bailuo, Wangshi, Sanzhou, Qiaoshi

Three townships:
Hongcheng Township, Qipan Township, Zhemu Township

Two other areas:
Dayuan, Huanghu

Climate

See also
48619 Jianli, a minor planet named after Jianli

References

County-level divisions of Hubei
Jingzhou
Cities in Hubei